Akinwunmi (variant form Akinwumi) is a Yoruba male given name. Notable people include:
Akinwunmi Ambode Governor of Lagos State
Akinwunmi Isola  Nigerian playwright
Akinwumi Adesina  President of the African Development Bank
Obafemi Akinwunmi Martins Nigerian footballer

Yoruba given names
Yoruba-language surnames
African masculine given names